The Blues (known as the Auckland Blues from 1996 to 1999) is a New Zealand professional rugby union team based in Auckland, who play in the Super Rugby competition. Like New Zealand's four other Super Rugby teams, the Blues were established by the NZRU in 1996. One of the most successful teams in Super Rugby history, the Blues won the competition in its first two seasons, 1996 and 1997, and again in 2003, as well as an all Australasian competition in 2021, additionally, the team were finalists in 1998 and 2022 and semi-finalists in 2007 and 2011.

History

Formation, Early Years and Immediate Success (1996–97)

Along with New Zealand's other Super Rugby sides, the Blues were established by the NZRU to take part in the newly formed Super 12 competition which, involved teams from South Africa and Australia in addition to New Zealand. Each of New Zealand's five sides represented a number of provincial unions, with the Blues representing the Auckland, Counties Manukau and Thames Valley unions, while the neighbouring Waikato Chiefs representing the Waikato, Bay of Plenty, King Country, Northland and North Harbour unions. As the amount of international representatives in the Auckland region was thought to be unfair, it was split up between The Blues and The Chiefs. During this era, the Blues played the majority of their home matches at Eden Park, with round robin fixtures occasionally held at Growers Stadium in Pukekohe.

The Blues tasted immediate success, winning the Super 12 back-to-back in 1996 and 1997. In 1996 the side won eight of eleven round robin matches and finished the regular season in second place (behind the Queensland Reds on 41 points. They then went on to defeat Northern Transvaaal, now the Bulls, 48–11 in the semi-final at Eden Park. This result secured a home final, where the Blues comfortably defeated the  45–21. In 1997, the side improved on their previous season, comfortably topping the table with 50 points after going undefeated in the regular season, the sole blemish on an otherwise perfect season being a draw with Northern Transvaal in a re-match of the previous season's semi-final. The Blues once again easily won their semi-final, defeating the  55–36 at Eden Park and again securing a home final. The 1997 final was a more hard fought encounter than the previous year's, with the Blues defeating the ACT Brumbies 23–7.

Middle Years (1998–2005)
By the end of the 1990s the number of international representatives from the Blues region had decreased. This led the Blues and the Chiefs to arrange a swap, where the Chiefs would represent the Thames Valley and Counties Manukau provincial unions in exchange for the Blues representing the Northland and North Harbour unions in addition to Auckland. Although in the seasons leading up to the trade North Harbour and Northland had outperformed Counties Manukau and Thames Valley in provincial rugby (thus potentially widening the already sizeable gap between the Blues' and Chiefs' on-field performance), it enabled both teams to represent unions in closer geographical proximity. Because of this trade, the Blues lost the area colloquially referred to as South Auckland, (excluding those portions of the South Auckland to the north of Manurewa). Thus, the Blues traded a portion of South Auckland for the Northern portion of the Auckland region and Northland, and still do not represent the entire Auckland region. Generally supporters in the South Auckland region identify as Blues supporters even though they are technically in the Chiefs region. In 2000, the Auckland Blues dropped the Auckland prefix from their name, and became known simply as 'Blues'.

The 1998 season saw the Blues again top the points table with 43 points at the conclusion of the round robin, with nine wins and two losses to their credit. They defeated the Otago Highlanders by 37–31 in the side's third consecutive home semi-final, securing a home final against the Crusaders, a match which promised a great deal due to Auckland's traditional sporting rivalry with Canterbury. The Crusaders ultimately won the match by 20–13, putting an end to the Blues' dominance of the competition. 

From 1999 – 2002 the Blues' onfield performance was poor, missing the playoffs every season, finishing at an all-time low of 11th on the ladder in 2001 with just four wins for the season. The club was able to turn its from around in the 2003 season, topping the ladder with 49 points and 10 wins from 11 matches. The team went on to defeat the ACT Brumbies by 42–21 in the semi-final, before beating the Crusaders 21–17 in the final for the team's third Super Rugby title. The Blues were unable to follow their 2003 success up in 2004 and 2005 however, missing the playoffs in both seasons.

Super 14 Era (2006–10)

The expanded 14 team competition could not have started worse for the Blues, who were in 2006 forced by the NZRU to include North Harbour captain Rua Tipoki in their squad of 24 players who are 'protected' from the draft. Tipoki was originally to be excluded from the draft due to personal circumstances to stay in Auckland. Andrew Mehrtens had in the past done this with the Crusaders. The NZRU however forced coach David Nucifora to pick Tipoki in his 24-man squad and hence drop another player. It is believed the NZRU was in favour of dropping players such as Isa Nacewa who are ineligible to play for the All Blacks. Instead, Nucifora excluded All Black Isaia Toeava, who subsequently played for the Hurricanes in 2006. Following the draft fiasco, and the forgettable season which followed, the Blues showed signs of resurgence in 2007, finishing the round robin in fourth place, securing a semi-final against the Sharks in Durban. The travel and form of the opposition were too difficult to overcome, however, with the Blues losing to the eventual runners-up by 34 – 18. The 2008 season, the final under coach David Nucifora, saw the team finish the season with an 8 – 5 record and a sixth-place finish on the ladder. In 2009, Pat Lam was appointed as coach, however the team was not able to make significant improvements under his leadership for the remainder of Super 14, missing the playoffs in both the 2009 and 2010 seasons.

Super Rugby Era (2011–present)

2011 season

In 2011 the Super Rugby competition was expanded to 15 teams and adopted a conference format. The Blues had a successful start to the season, defeating the Crusaders by 24–22 at Eden Park. This was followed by a win and a loss on their South African tour, followed by a 22-all draw against the Western Force in Perth. This was followed by a seven match winning streak between rounds five and twelve. However, the mid-season winning streak came to an abrupt end with a 37 – 31 loss to the Queensland Reds in Brisbane, which initiated a four match losing-streak. In the final round-robin match of the season, the Blues defeated the Highlanders by 33–16 at Eden Park, securing the side's first playoff appearance since 2007 and first home playoff match since 2003. The team subsequently defeated the New South Wales Waratahs 26 – 13 to secure a semi-final against the Queensland Reds in Brisbane, which they lost 30–13.

The 2011 season also marked the departure of Kurtis Haiu, who was diagnosed with a bone tumour in April. Following his diagnosis, he took an indefinite break from rugby to focus on his health.

2012 season

2012, the team's fourth season under coach Pat Lam, saw the arrival of former Hurricanes icons, and 2011 Rugby World Cup winners, Ma'a Nonu and Piri Weepu. The regular season began on 24 February against the Crusaders at Eden Park. Following two successive losses to start the season, the side's first victory came away to the Bulls, with starting debutant Gareth Anscombe scoring all of the Blues points in the 29–23 win. In doing so, Anscombe set a team record for most points in a match. In the same match, Rene Ranger became the first Blues player to receive a White Card, which resulted in a two-week suspension. Seven consecutive losses followed, beginning with the Stormers in round four, and finishing with the Hurricanes in round eleven. Growing frustration amongst fans was evident during this period, with racist remarks directed at coach Pat Lam via social media, talkback radio and the Blues own website. Lam, who is of Samoan descent, received support from a number of former Blues players during this period, including Michael Jones and Eroni Clarke. After beating the Lions in round twelve, the Blues suffered the biggest defeat in club history with a 59 – 12 loss away to the Crusaders, which was followed by losses at home to the Highlanders and table-topping Chiefs. The Blues finished the season on a high note, with wins against the Western Force and Brumbies.

On 17 July, Pat Lam was released. On the same day, Sir John Kirwan was appointed as head coach for the 2013 and 2014 seasons. In August, the Blues' full coaching staff for the 2013 season was announced, with Sir Graham Henry taking on a role as technical advisor and defensive coach, Mick Byrne appointed forwards and kicking coach, and Grant Doorey appointed skills and backline coach.

2013 season

The 2013 season saw an all new Blues team with many players leaving, including Ma'a Nonu to the Highlanders and Gareth Anscombe to the Chiefs. On the morning of 31 October 2012 new coach Sir John Kirwan announced the 2013 Blues squad which included 14 Super Rugby debutants, and Ali Williams taking over as captain. Handed a bye on the first round the Blues started the regular season on 23 February 2013 with a 34–20 away win against the Hurricanes, followed by a 34–15 home win against the Crusaders the next week.  3 consecutive losses followed, including the Bulls first victory at Eden Park. The Blues regained some form again, winning 4 of the next 5 games. Beating the Highlanders at home and completing the double over the Hurricanes with a 28–6 win at Eden Park before losing a close game against the Reds.  The Blues then defeated both the Stormers and the Rebels before losing 3 games in a row to the Crusaders, Brumbies, and Highlanders respectively.  The Blues then travelled to South Africa with two must win games against the Sharks and the Cheetahs, unfortunately losing both and ending the Blues chances of making the play-offs. Ali Williams played his 100th game for the Blues against the Sharks.  The Blues returned to New Zealand with a last home game against the already play-off qualified Chiefs. Despite a red card to Kane Barrett for stomping in the 23rd minute, the Blues played a remarkably strong game, taking the lead just after half-time but a yellow card to first-five Baden Kerr struck another blow for the Blues.  The mounting Chiefs pressure paid off resulting in a Ben Tameifuna try with 17 minutes to go, winning the game for the Chiefs.  The Blues walked off the field to a standing ovation from their fans, the first time an Eden Park crowd had been upstanding for a defeat.

The Blues finished the season in 10th place, with 6 players earning All Black call ups and Frank Halai as the team's top try scorer scoring 10 tries in his debut season. They signed international super star Benji Marshall for the 2014 season (only to return to league with the Dragons halfway through it) and Ma'a Nonu for two seasons starting in 2014.

2014 season
The Blues 2014 season started with coach Sir John Kirwan announcing 6 new players to the squad including three All Blacks with the return of Ma'a Nonu and Tony Woodcock after they both played with the Highlanders for a season, and Jerome Kaino. This also included former NRL player Benji Marshall who had previously played with the Wests Tigers for 10 years.

The Blues season started with an away loss to the Highlanders, going down 29–21. The next week they played their first home game of the season at Eden Park, defeating the Crusaders 35–24. They travelled to South Africa for two games against the Sharks and the Lions, losing both games but coming away with a losing bonus point against the Lions. They returned to New Zealand for two home games against the Cheetahs and the Highlanders, both of which they won bringing the up to 6th place on the ladder. The team travelled to Canberra to face the Brumbies and were defeated 26–9, and were defeated again by the Hurricanes in Wellington after a bye week. This was followed by two home games against the Waratahs and the Reds, winning both and coming away with a bonus point win against the Reds. They then lost their next two games going down to the Chiefs and the Sharks, picking up a losing bonus point against the Sharks. They returned to Eden park to defeat the Hurricanes, followed by a bonus point win in Perth against the Western Force. This put them into 8th place on the ladder with two games to play in the regular season before finals, needing to place in the top 6 for a spot in the play-offs. They lost to the Crusaders in Christchurch, therefore to make the finals they needed to win their final game against the Chiefs who were in the same situation. They lost their final game against the Chiefs going down 11–8, putting them out of the finals and ending a six-game winning streak at Eden Park for the season. The Blues finished 10th overall and 5th place in the New Zealand conference.

Ihaia West, Patrick Tuipulotu, Benji Marshall, and Tom Donnelly all made their Blues super rugby debut in the 2014 season.

2015 season
The 2015 season started with coach Sir John Kirwan announcing the Blues squad, with the inclusion of 11 new players after losing 12 players including Ma'a Nonu and Piri Weepu, who both played over 100 super rugby games.

The Blues season started with a loss to the Chiefs, going down 23–18, picking up a losing bonus point. This was followed by an unsuccessful tour of South Africa, going down to the Stormers and Cheetahs, coming away with a single bonus point from a 25–24 loss to the Cheetahs. This was followed by four consecutive losses against the Lions, Hurricanes, Waratahs and Chiefs, 3 of which they picked up a losing bonus point. Their first win of the season came against the Brumbies at Eden Park with a 16–14 victory, ending the Blues 9 game losing streak. This was followed by consecutive losses against the Highlanders and Crusaders, picking up a bonus point against the Highlanders. This was followed by a strong 41–24 win against the Force. Their next game against the Rebels was their final away game of the season, they lost 42–22, ending the season with no away wins, having only won two away games in the last three years. Their final four games were all at home with high hopes of finishing the season on a high. They won the first game 23–18 against the South African conference leaders the Bulls, however this was their last win of the season going down in their final three games against the Hurricanes, Crusaders and Highlanders. This ended the franchises worst super rugby season, ending in 14th place ahead of the Force, with just 3 from 16 wins for the season.

The end of the season was marked by the resignation of coach Sir John Kirwan, who had been with the team for the last three years winning just 17 out of 58 games. The Blues signed former All Black captain Tana Umaga to replace Sir John Kirwan as head coach of the Blues.

2016 season
The Blues endured yet another disappointing year in 2016, although there were some improvements. A close first round win over the Highlanders by 33-31 was followed by successive losses to the Crusaders (28-13) and Hurricanes (19-23). A 25-25 draw with the Reds in Round 4 was followed by a 24-16 win over the Jaguares in Round 6 (Round 5 being a bye). A week later the Blues lost to the Chiefs by 23-29, but bounced back with wins over the Sharks (23-18), Rebels (36-30) and Kings (34-18). A humbling 5-43 loss to eventual finalists the Lions was followed by a tight 17-13 win over the Force. Another tight game resulted in a 21-26 loss to the Crusaders, while a yet another loss followed against the Hurricanes 27-37. Dominant wins against the Brumbies (40-15) and Waratahs (34-28) showed that the Blues could still be highly competitive, however their last-place conference finish left them outside the qualification pool for the season´s semi-finals, with rival New Zealand franchise the Hurricanes emerging the eventual champions.

2017 season
2017 again saw the Blues finish bottom of the New Zealand conference, with an even 7 wins and 7 losses to their credit. The up and down nature of their season was reflected in the margins of both their biggest win - 56-18 in Round 1 over the Rebels - and their heaviest defeat - 48-21 to the Sunwolves in the final round in Tokyo. During the 2017 British and Irish Lions tour, the Blues pulled off a shock win over the British and Irish Lions 22–26 at Eden Park. Rookie Blues winger Reiko Ioane distinguished himself during the match, scoring a try and notably outpacing Lions and England winger Elliot Daly. Blues half-back Ihaia West and All Black centre Sonny Bill Williams also impressed during the match, both scoring tries and West adding a penalty and conversion to a remarkable result against the tourists.

2018 Season

2018 would see the Blues again finish last in their conference, with a poor record of only four wins vs 12 losses in a miserable season. Crushing losses to the Hurricanes (42-24) and Crusaders (54-17) in the last two rounds illustrated how far the team´s performances had collapsed from coach Tana Umaga´s first, relatively respectable season in charge, and emphasized the need for structural reform at the club. A reshuffle resulted in Umaga being demoted to an assistant coaching role, and the appointment of former All Black, Crusaders assistant and Tasman Mako head coach Leon MacDonald as new Blues coach the following season.

2019 Season

MacDonald´s first year in charge saw little in the way of definite improvements to the Blues win–loss record, with only 5 wins from 17 games giving them their sixth consecutive last-place finish in the New Zealand conference. All Black prop Karl Tu’inukuafe and former All Black Maá Nonu were recruited from the Chiefs and Toulon, respectively. While their overall standards had improved, their margins of both victory and defeat remaining consistently low, the Blues were unable to mount much of a challenge that season.

2020 Season

2022 Season

The Blues participated in the first Super Rugby Pacific season in 2022, and finished first in the 12 team round robin. In round 9 they scored their first win in Christchurch over the Crusaders since 2004, winning 27-24 in a thriller at Orangetheory Stadium. In round 15 they beat the Warratahs 20-17, by a Zarn Sullivan drop goal after the 80 minute mark. This marked the franchise's 13th straight win, the longest in franchise history. In the Quarter-Finals they played the Highlanders, who they beat 35-6, to reach their first Semi-Final in 11 years. In the Semi-Final they beat the Brumbies 20-19 in a thrilling encounter. Brumbies first-five Noah Lolesio had a match winning drop goal attempt, but this was charged down by Blues prop Ofa Tu'ungafasi, in turn sending the Blues to their first final since 2003, where they were defeated by the Crusaders 21-7 in front of a packed out Eden Park.

Season-by-Season summary
{| class="wikitable"
|align=center bgcolor=#FFCCCC|Super 12
|align=center bgcolor=#FFE6BD|Super 14
|align=center bgcolor=#87CEEB|Super Rugby
|}

A season-by-season summary of Blues regular season results and playoff fixtures is shown below:

Results per opposition
Blues Super Rugby results vs different opponents 

 Champions (3)
1996, 1997, 2003 
 Runners-up (2)
1998, 2022

Super Rugby Trans-Tasman (2021)
 Champions (1)
2021

World Club 10s
 Champions (1)
2014

Brisbane Global Tens
 Champions (1)
2018

Rivalries
Overall the Blues have dated rivalries with all other New Zealand-based Super Rugby teams (Chiefs, Hurricanes, Crusaders and Highlanders), however a notable trophy is contested between the Blues and Highlanders. The Gordon Hunter Memorial Trophy is contested between the Blues and Highlanders as a part of regular season fixtures between the two sides. The trophy is awarded in memory of Gordon Hunter, who had been head coach of both teams prior to his passing away in 2002.

Stadium

The team's primary home ground is Eden Park, located in the central Auckland suburb of Kingsland. The stadium has a capacity of 50,000. In addition to hosting Blues home matches, the ground is the home of the Auckland Rugby Football Union and Auckland Cricket, and is a frequent host of All Blacks matches, and hosted the 2011 Rugby World Cup semi-finals, third-place playoff, and final.

In addition to Eden Park, Blues home matches are occasionally held at North Harbour Stadium, home of the North Harbour Rugby Union, and Okara Park, home of the Northland Rugby Union.

Franchise area and ownership

The Blues represent the Auckland, North Harbour, and Northland rugby unions. Since 2014 the club until 2020 has been owned 60% (divided 65%, 29% and 6%) by the three unions, through Rugby Holdings Ltd., and 40% by private investor Bolton Equities Ltd.  The previous Blues (and Auckland Rugby Football Union) CEO was Michael Redman, who was formerly CEO of the New Zealand Breakers basketball team. The current board is made up of six members. Don Mackinnon, also a former New Zealand Netball and High Performance Sport NZ director, took over in 2019 as Blues Chairman from Tony Carter who chaired the board since it became a stand-alone organisation in 2013. The current board includes John Hart, Sam Lotu-liga, Richard Dellabarca, Kate Daly, Grant Graham and Brian Wilsher.

Andrew Hore took up the top job as CEO of the Blues in October 2019. Hore beat off serious competition from 70 applicants to become Blues CEO and believes glory days can return to the team's home ground of Eden Park. Hore was previously CEO at the Ospreys in Wales before going on to turn around the New South Wales Waratahs and NSW Rugby before deciding it was time to return to New Zealand to the Blues' challenge.

Development team
The Blues have fielded a development team in competitions such as the Pacific Rugby Cup and in matches against other representative teams for several seasons. Known as the Blues Development XV, the squad is selected from the best emerging rugby talent in the Blues catchment area and is composed of Blues contracted players, wider training group members, under 20s, and selected club players.

Current squad

The squad for the 2023 Super Rugby Pacific season is:

2022 coaching staff

 Head coach: Leon MacDonald
 Assistant coach: Craig McGrath (Defence coach)
 Assistant coach: Tom Coventry (Forwards coach)
 Assistant coach: Dan Halangahu (Attack/skills coach)
 Assistant coach: Ben Afeaki (Scrum coach)
 Assistant coach: Joe Schmidt (Support coach)

Captains
 Zinzan Brooke (1996–1997)
 Michael Jones (1998)
 Robin Brooke (1999–2001)
 Glenn Taylor (2002)
 Xavier Rush (2003–2005)
 Keven Mealamu (2006, 2009–2012)
 Troy Flavell (2007–2008)
 Ali Williams (2013)
 Luke Braid (2014)
 Jerome Kaino (2015–2016)
 James Parsons (2016–2017)
 Augustine Pulu (2018)
 Blake Gibson (2019)
 Patrick Tuipulotu (2019–2021)
 Dalton Papalii (2022–present)

Coaches

Notes: Official Super Rugby competition matches only, including finals.

Records and achievements

Individual records

Most appearances

Most points

Most tries

Most points in a match

Most tries in a match

Most points in a season

Most tries in a season

Team Records

 Highest Regular Season Placing: 1st (1996, 1997, 1998, 2003, 2022)
 Most Wins in a Season: 15 (2022)
 Most Points in a Season: 435 (1997)
 Most Tries in a Season: 56 (1996, 1997, 2021)
 Fewest Wins in a Season: 3 (2015)
 Fewest Points in a Season: 202 (1999)
 Fewest Tries in a Season: 15 (1999)
 Biggest Win: 60 – 7 (53 point win in 2002 vs. Hurricanes – Wellington)
 Biggest Loss: 12 – 59 (47 point loss in 2012 vs. Crusaders - Christchurch)
 Most points ever scored in a game: 74 (74 - 28 win in 1998 vs. Stormers - Auckland)
 Fewest points ever scored in a game: 3 (3 - 20 loss in 2004 vs. Reds - Brisbane), (3 - 23 loss in 2013 vs. Crusaders - Christchurch)

All time record

 Games played: 290
 Games won: 154
 Games lost: 131
 Games drawn: 5
 Winning percentage: 53.10%
 Points for: 7750
 Points against: 6983
 Tries for: 922
 Tries conceded: 767

Record updated as of Round 9 v Brumbies, 2017

Players that have represented the All Blacks
87 officially recognized Blues players have gone on to represent the All Blacks as of the 2017 season.
There have been a total of 268 players to have played for the Blues which means that 30% of all Blues over two decades have either represented the All Blacks or have gone on to represent them.

 John Afoa (36 tests, 2 matches)
 Ben Atiga (1 test)
 Norm Berryman (1 test)
 Andrew Blowers (11 tests, 7 matches)
 Anthony Boric (24 tests, 1 match)
 Daniel Braid (6 tests)
 Robin Brooke (62 tests, 7 matches)
 Zinzan Brooke (58 tests, 42 matches)
 Olo Brown (56 tests, 13 matches)
 Mark Carter (7 tests, 3 matches)
 Adrian Cashmore (2 tests)
 Caleb Clarke (5 tests)
 Eroni Clarke (10 tests, 14 matches)
 Greg Cooper (7 tests)
 Jimmy Cowan (51 tests, 2 matches)
 Ron Cribb (15 tests)
 Chresten Davis (2 matches)
 Steve Devine (10 tests)
 Tom Donnelly (15 tests)
 Matt Duffie (2 matches)
 Craig Dowd (60 tests, 7 matches)
 Marc Ellis (8 tests, 12 matches)
 Tamati Ellison (4 tests, 1 match)
 Bryn Evans (2 tests)
 Nick Evans (16 tests)
 Charlie Faumuina (50 tests)
 Greg Feek (10 tests)
 Malakai Fekitoa (23 tests)
 Sean Fitzpatrick (92 tests, 36 matches)
 Troy Flavell (22 tests)
 Richard Fromont (10 matches)
 Rico Gear (19 tests, 1 match)
 Frank Halai (1 test)
 Alex Hodgman (4 tests)
 Shane Howarth (4 tests, 6 matches)
 Doug Howlett (62 tests, 1 match)
 Dillon Hunt (1 test, 1 match)
 Craig Innes (17 tests, 13 matches)
 Akira Ioane (2 tests, 1 match)
 Rieko Ioane (34 tests)
 Michael Jones (55 tests, 19 matches)
 Jerome Kaino (83 tests, 2 matches)
 Tanerau Latimer (5 tests, 1 match)
 Danny Lee (2 tests)
 Walter Little (50 tests, 25 matches)
 Jonah Lomu (63 tests, 10 matches)
 Keith Lowen (1 test)
 Steven Luatua (15 tests)
 Angus Macdonald (2 tests)
 Alby Mathewson (4 tests, 1 match)
 Mark Mayerhofler (6 tests)
 Luke McAlister (30 tests, 1 match)
 Keven Mealamu (132 tests, 1 match)
 Kees Meeuws (42 tests, 3 matches)
 Brad Mika (3 tests)
 Dylan Mika (7 tests, 1 match)
 George Moala (4 tests)
 Mils Muliaina (100 tests, 2 matches)
 Waisake Naholo (26 tests)
 Craig Newby (3 tests)
 Ma'a Nonu (103 tests, 1 match)
 Dalton Papalii (4 tests)
 James Parsons (2 tests)
 Tim Perry (6 tests, 2 matches)
 Charles Piutau (17 tests)
 Augustine Pulu (2 tests)
 Caleb Ralph (14 tests, 2 matches)
 Rene Ranger (6 tests)
 Greg Rawlinson (4 tests)
 Charles Riechelmann (6 tests, 4 matches)
 Mark Robinson (3 tests, 5 matches)
 Joe Rokocoko (68 tests, 1 match)
 Xavier Rush (8 tests)
 Francis Saili (2 tests)
 Carlos Spencer (35 tests, 9 matches)
 Benson Stanley (3 tests)
 Jeremy Stanley (3 matches)
 Lee Stensness (8 tests, 6 matches)
 Hoskins Sotutu (5 tests)
 Angus Ta'avao (14 tests)
 Saimone Taumoepeau (3 tests, 1 match)
 Glenn Taylor (1 test, 5 matches)
 Isaia Toeava (36 tests, 1 match)
 Ofisa Tonu'u (5 tests, 3 matches)
 Ofa Tu'ungafasi (39 tests)
 Karl Tu'inukuafe (17 tests)
 Mose Tuiali'i (9 tests, 1 match)
 Patrick Tuipulotu (35 tests)
 Anthony Tuitavake (6 tests, 1 match)
 Sam Tuitupou (9 tests)
 Joeli Vidiri (2 tests)
 Piri Weepu (71 tests, 2 matches)
 Ali Williams (77 tests, 1 match)
 Sonny Bill Williams (58 tests)
 Royce Willis (12 tests)
 Derren Witcombe (5 tests)
 Tony Woodcock (118 tests)
 Rudi Wulf (4 tests)

References

External links
 
 SANZAAR website
 New Zealand Super Rugby website

 
Super Rugby champions
Super Rugby teams
New Zealand rugby union teams
Sport in Auckland
1996 establishments in New Zealand
Rugby clubs established in 1996
Rugby union in the Auckland Region